Naomi Hosokawa (細川直美 Hosokawa Naomi; real name: Chiho Katsurayama (葛山知保 Katsurayama Chiho; born 18 June 1974 in Yokohama, Kanagawa Prefecture, Japan) is a Japanese actress and singer.

Filmography

Films
Shigure no Ki (1998) - Yūko Furuya
The Setting Sun (2022)

Television
Karin (1993–94)
Hoshi no Kinka (1995) - Shōko Yūki
Hideyoshi (1996) - Sato

References

External links

JMDb Profile 
Japanese Profile w/ pic

1974 births
Living people
People from Yokohama
Japanese television actresses
Asadora lead actors